Tipula vittata is a species of fly in the family Tipulidae. It is found in the  Palearctic .

References

External links
Images representing Tipula at BOLD
BioLib

Tipulidae
Insects described in 1804
Nematoceran flies of Europe
Taxa named by Johann Wilhelm Meigen